Arlecchino is the Italian name for Harlequin, a type of comic servant character.

Arlecchino may also refer to:

Arts and entertainment
 Arlecchino (opera), a one-act opera by Ferrucio Busoni composed in 1913
 Arlecchino (1949 painting), an artwork by Paolo De Poli
 Arlecchino (1979 album), an album by Mango
 "Arlecchino" (1981 song), a song by Rondo Veneziano, from the album La Serenissima

Vehicles
 Aviamilano CPV1 Arlecchino, a sailplane
 ETR 250 Arlecchino, a passenger train type, see FS Class ETR 300

See also

 
 
 Harlequin (disambiguation)